The following is a list of notable deaths in September 2006.

Entries for each day are listed alphabetically by surname. A typical entry lists information in the following sequence:
 Name, age, country of citizenship at birth, subsequent country of citizenship (if applicable), reason for notability, cause of death (if known), and reference.

September 2006

1
Tommy Chesbro, 66, American wrestler and coach (Oklahoma State University), heart attack.
Nellie Connally, 87, American widow of Texas Governor John Connally, shared car at John F. Kennedy assassination.
Anil Kumar Dutta, 73, Indian artist, founder of Academy of Creative Art.
György Faludy, 95, Hungarian poet, writer and translator.
Rashid Maidin, 89, Malaysian leader of the Communist Party.
Ronald Mansbridge, 100, British-born American publisher, founded first US branch of Cambridge University Press.
Richard Frewen Martin, 88, British fighter pilot and test pilot.
Warren Mitofsky, 72, American pollster, creator of the exit poll, heart failure.
Bob O'Connor, 61, American Mayor of Pittsburgh, Pennsylvania, brain cancer.
Travis I. Payze, 60, Australian footballer, prostate cancer.
Sir Kyffin Williams, 88, Welsh artist, lung and prostate cancer.
Pierre Monichon, 80, French musicologist and inventor of the Harmoneon.

2
Bob Mathias, 75, American decathlete, twice Olympic gold medalist, United States Representative, cancer.
Deforrest Most, 89, American gymnast, helped establish Muscle Beach, heart failure.
Willi Ninja, 45, American dancer and choreographer, AIDS.
Clermont Pépin, 80, Canadian composer, liver cancer.
Silverio Pérez, 91, Mexican bullfighter, renal illness.
Lionel Pickering, 74, British businessman, chairman of Derby County, cancer.
Anthony Poon, 61, Singaporean abstract artist, lung cancer.
Dewey Redman, 75, American jazz saxophonist, father of Joshua Redman, liver failure.
Monty Stickles, 68, American football player (San Francisco 49ers), heart failure.
Charlie Williams, 77, British comedian and footballer (Doncaster Rovers), Parkinson's disease.
Sahibzada Muhammad Ishaq Zaffar, 61, Pakistani politician, heart attack.

3
Françoise Claustre, 69, French ethnologist and archaeologist.
Levi Fox, 92, British conservationist and historian, Director of the Shakespeare Birthplace Trust.
Ian Hamer, 73, British jazz trumpeter.
Eva Knardahl, 79, Norwegian classical pianist.
Annemarie Wendl, 91, German actress, heart failure.

4
Rémy Belvaux, 38, Belgian writer, film producer and director (Man Bites Dog), suicide.
Ingrid Bjoner, 78, Norwegian soprano.
John Conte, 90, American actor, founded TV station KMIR, natural causes.
Giacinto Facchetti, 64, Italian footballer, cancer.
James Fee, 56, American photographer, liver cancer.
Tamás Fejér, 86, Hungarian film director.
Mark Anthony Graham, 33, Canadian Olympian and soldier, friendly fire.
Steve Irwin, 44, Australian naturalist (The Crocodile Hunter), stabbed in the chest by a stingray barb.
Khadaffy Janjalani, 31, Filipino militant, leader of Abu Sayyaf, shot.
Moses Khumalo, 26, South African jazz saxophonist, Best Newcomer at South African Music Awards (2002), suicide by hanging.
Clive Lythgoe, 79, British pianist.
Colin Thiele, 85, Australian children's author, heart failure.
Astrid Varnay, 88, American soprano.

5
Sir Michael Davies, 85, British jurist.
Anne Gregg, 66, British television presenter (Holiday), cancer.
Gösta Löfgren, 83, Swedish football player.
Hilary Mason, 89, British character actress.
John McLusky, 83, British comics artist (James Bond).
J. Bazzel Mull, 91, American Christianity preacher and gospel music promoter.

6
Warren Bolster, 59, American surf and skateboard photographer, suicide by gunshot.
Sir John Drummond, 71, British controller of BBC Radio 3 and The Proms.
Lovette George, 44, American Broadway theatre singer and actress, ovarian cancer.
Peter Greenough, 89, American finance columnist (The Boston Globe), husband of Beverly Sills, after long illness.
Peter Hyndman, 64, Canadian politician and lawyer, cancer.
Gordon Manning, 89, American television journalist (NBC and CBS), heart attack.
Sir Michael Marshall, 76, British politician, MP for Arundel (1974–1997), President of the Chichester Festival Theatre.
Mohammed Taha Mohammed Ahmed, c.50, Sudanese newspaper editor, beheaded.
Agha Shahi, 86, Pakistani diplomat and foreign minister, heart attack.
Mark Wright, 27, British soldier, posthumously awarded George Cross.

7
Efraim Allsalu, 77, Estonian painter.
Sir Norman Blacklock, 78, British physician, Medical Officer to the Queen (1976–1993).
Clem Coetzee, 67, Zimbabwean conservationist, heart attack.
James deAnda, 81, American lawyer and federal judge, part of the legal team in Hernandez v. Texas, prostate cancer.
Jorge di Giandoménico, 75, Argentine Olympic sports shooter.
Joan Donaldson, 60, American founding head of the CBC Newsworld television network, complications from injuries.
Sir Stephen Egerton, 74, British diplomat, Ambassador to Italy (1989–1992).
James Hawthorne, 74, British controller of the BBC in Northern Ireland (1979–1989).
Robert Earl Jones, 96, American actor, father of James Earl Jones.
Ronald St. John Macdonald, 78, Canadian legal academic and jurist.
Cornelius O'Leary, 78, Irish historian.
John M. Watson, 69, American jazz musician and actor, non-Hodgkin lymphoma.

8
Hilda Bernstein, 99, British-born South African author and anti-apartheid activist, heart failure.
Peter Brock, 61, Australian touring car racer, car accident. 
William Harper, 90, Rhodesian politician
Thomas Lee Judge, 71, American Governor of Montana (1973–1981), pulmonary fibrosis.
Frank Middlemass, 87, British character actor (As Time Goes By).
Erk Russell, 80, American college football coach (University of Georgia, Georgia Southern University), stroke.
Fred Spiess, 86, American oceanographer and marine explorer, cancer.

9
 Gérard Brach, 79, French screenwriter (The Fearless Vampire Killers, The Name of the Rose), cancer.
Clair Burgener, 84, American Representative for California (1973–1983), complications from Alzheimer's disease.
Matt Gadsby, 27, British footballer (Hinckley United), ARVC.
Émilie Mondor, 25, Canadian Olympic distance runner, car accident.
Elisabeth Ogilvie, 89, American author.
Herbert Rudley, 95, American actor.
Keshavram Kashiram Shastri, 101, Indian founder of VHP, natural causes.
William Bernard Ziff, Jr., 76, American publishing magnate, prostate cancer.

10
Ernestine Bayer, 97, American rower, complications from pneumonia.
 Patty Berg, 88, American golf pioneer, founder of the LPGA, complications from Alzheimer's disease.
 James C. Hickman, 79, American actuary and academic administrator, Dean of University of Wisconsin–Madison School of Business (1985–1990).
 Sir John Johnston, 84, British courtier, Comptroller of the Lord Chamberlain's Office (1981–1987).
 Ramanlal Joshi, 80, Indian literary critic and editor.
 Melanie Lomax, 56, American civil rights lawyer, former president of the Los Angeles Board of Police Commissioners, car accident.
Ted Risenhoover, 71, American Representative for Oklahoma (1975–1979).
 Bennie Smith, 72, American blues guitarist, heart attack.
 Daniel Wayne Smith, 20, American actor, son of Anna Nicole Smith, drug overdose.
 Taufa'ahau Tupou IV, 88, Tongan royal, King of Tonga, after illness.

11
 William Auld, 81, British poet, author and supporter of Esperanto.
 Peter Clentzos, 97, American-born Greek 1932 Summer Olympics competitor in pole vault.
 Pat Corley, 76, American actor (Murphy Brown), heart failure.
János Dévai, 66, Hungarian Olympic cyclist.
 Solange Fernex, French ecologist and green politician.
 Joachim Fest, 79, German historian and journalist.
Joseph Hayes, 88, American author (The Desperate Hours).
Johannes Bob van Benthem, 85, Dutch lawyer, first president of the European Patent Office (1977–1985).

12
John S.R. Duncan, 85, British diplomat.
Raymond Mikesell, 93, American economist at the Bretton Woods Conference.
Emily Perez, 23, American first female African-American Army officer to die in combat, improvised explosive device.
Craig Roberts, 38, Canadian Olympic wrestler.
Bill Saul, 65, American football player (Pittsburgh Steelers), cancer.
Edna Staebler, 100, Canadian cookbook and non-fiction author, stroke.

13
Brian Biggins, 66, English football player (Chester City).
Cesare Barbetti, 75, Italian actor and voice actor.
Sir Douglas Dodds-Parker, 97, British Conservative minister and wartime SOE officer.
Christopher Essex, 61, Australian fashion designer, cancer.
N. V. Krishnaiah, 76, Indian politician.
Ann Richards, 73, American Governor of Texas (1991–1995), esophageal cancer.
Peter Tevis, 69, American musician, Parkinson's Disease.

14
Norman Brooks, 78, Canadian singer, Al Jolson imitator, emphysema.
Silviu Brucan, 90, Romanian ambassador to the United States, opponent of Nicolae Ceauşescu.
Elizabeth Choy, 95, Singaporean war heroine, first female legislator, pancreatic cancer.
Miklós Hargitay, 80, Hungarian former Mr. Universe and actor, ex-husband of Jayne Mansfield, father of Mariska Hargitay.
J. William Kime, 72, American former commandant of the Coast Guard.
Andrey Kozlov, 41, Russian First Deputy Chairman of the Central Bank of Russia, shot.
Peter Ling, 80, British television writer, creator of Crossroads.
Paulo Marques, 58, Brazilian journalist and presenter, brain cancer.
Esme Melville, 87, Australian film and television actress.
Terry O'Sullivan, 91, American television actor (Search for Tomorrow), pancreatic cancer.
Johnny Palmer, 88, American golfer, seven-time PGA Tour winner.
Frederic Wakeman, 68, American scholar of Chinese history.

15
Raymond Baxter, 84, British television presenter (Tomorrow's World).
Oriana Fallaci, 77, Italian journalist and writer, breast cancer.
Guy François, Haitian Army colonel, participated in failed coups in 1989 and 2001.
Charles L. Grant, 64, American horror and science fiction author, heart attack.
Douglas Henderson, 71, British politician.
Donald Kimball, 62, American defrocked Roman Catholic priest, convicted in sex abuse scandal.
Nitun Kundu, 70, Bangladeshi artist and sculptor.
David T. Lykken, 78, American professor of psychology (University of Minnesota).
Abe Saffron, 86, Australian nightclub owner and property developer.
Pablo Santos, 19, Mexican actor (Greetings from Tucson), plane crash.
Sergio Savarese, 48, Italian furniture designer, plane crash.
Meredith Thring, 90, British engineer.

16
John Allen, 80, American Olympic athlete.
Sten Andersson, 83, Swedish Minister for Foreign Affairs (1985–1991) and Minister for Social Affairs (1982–1985), heart attack.
Floyd Curry, 81, Canadian four-time Stanley Cup winner (Montreal Canadiens).
George Estman, 84, South African Olympic cyclist.
E. H. H. Green, 47, British historian, multiple sclerosis.
Zsuzsa Körmöczy, 82, Hungarian tennis player and coach, won 1958 French Championships.
Rob Levin, 51, American founder of freenode, head injury from bicycle accident.
Esther Martinez, 94, American Tewa storyteller and linguist, car accident.
Fouad el-Mohandes, 82, Egyptian comedy actor, heart failure.

17
Jack Banta, 81, American Major League Baseball player (Brooklyn Dodgers).
Al Casey, 89, American rock and country music guitarist.
George Heslop, 66, English footballer (Manchester City).
Patricia Kennedy Lawford, 82, American socialite, sister of John F. Kennedy, ex-wife of actor Peter Lawford, pneumonia.
Nathaniel Lubell, 90, American Olympic fencer and artist.
Edward D. Re, 85, American lawyer and judge.
Leonella Sgorbati, 65, Italian nun, shot.
Kazuyuki Sogabe, 58, Japanese anime voice actor (Sailor Moon, Dragon Ball).
 Dorothy C. Stratton, 107, American first director of the Coast Guard Women's Reserve.

18
Seán Clancy, 105, Irish oldest War of Independence veteran.
Edward J. King, 81, American Governor of Massachusetts (1979–1983).
Philip H. Melanson, 61, American academic, expert on assassinations, cancer.
Nilton Pereira Mendes, 30, Brazilian footballer, heart attack.
Leo Navratil, 85, Austrian psychiatrist.
Syd Thrift, 77, American general manager of the Pittsburgh Pirates and Baltimore Orioles.

19
Elizabeth Allen, 77, American actress (Donovan's Reef, Do I Hear a Waltz?, The Jackie Gleason Show).
Danny Flores, 77, American saxophonist and vocalist (The Champs), pneumonia.
Joe Glazer, 88, American singer-songwriter.
Martha Holmes, 83, American Life photographer, natural causes.
Sir Hugh Kawharu, 79, New Zealand academic and Māori leader.
Vico Magistretti, 86, Italian architect and designer.
Manuel Mindán Manero, 103, Spanish philosopher and priest, natural causes.
Roy Schuiten, 55, Dutch track and road racing cyclist.
Terry Smith, 47, Australian rules football player (Richmond, St Kilda), cancer.

20
Phạm Xuân Ẩn, 78, Vietnamese journalist, North Vietnamese spy during Vietnam War, emphysema.
Clarence Hill, 48, American convicted murderer, executed by lethal injection.
Henri Jayer, 84, French winemaker.
Armin Jordan, 74, Swiss conductor.
Beth Levine, 91, American shoe designer.
Sven Nykvist, 83, Swedish cinematographer and two-time Academy Award-winner.
John W. Peterson, 84, American gospel hymn writer, cancer.
Lillian Robinson, 65, American professor of women's studies (Concordia University).
Don Walser, 72, American country singer and yodeler, complications from diabetes.
Muddy Waters, 83, American college football coach (Michigan State University).
Dean Wooldridge, 93, American physicist, co-founder of TRW.

21
Boz Burrell, 60, British bassist and vocalist (Bad Company, King Crimson), heart attack.
Margaret Ekpo, 92, Nigerian politician and women's rights activist.
Alan Fletcher, 75, British graphic designer.
Gilbert Jonas, 76, American fundraiser for the NAACP.
Charles Larson, 86, American television writer and Emmy Award-nominated producer (The F.B.I.). 
Charles Rees, 78, British chemist.

22
Edward Albert, 55, American actor, son of actors Margo and Eddie Albert, lung cancer.
Carla Benschop, 56, Dutch basketball player.
Tommy Garnett, 91, English-born Australian cricketer and educator.
Enrique Gorriarán Merlo, 64, Argentine revolutionary and guerrilla leader, cardiac arrest due to abdominal aortic aneurysm.
Tommy Olivencia, 64, Puerto Rican salsa singer and bandleader.
Mary Orr, 95, American author whose story "The Wisdom of Eve" inspired the film All About Eve.

23
Sir Malcolm Arnold, 84, British Academy Award-winning film score composer (The Bridge on the River Kwai), chest infection.
Etta Baker, 93, American piedmont blues guitarist.
Sir Charles Cutler, 88, Australian Deputy Premier of New South Wales (1965–1975), cancer.
Aladár Pege, 67, Hungarian jazz musician.
Tim Rooney, 59, American actor, son of Mickey Rooney, dermatomyositis.

24
John S. Boskovich, 49, American artist and screenwriter (Without You I'm Nothing).
Joel Broyhill, 86, American Republican congressman for Virginia (1953–1975), heart failure and pneumonia.
Michael Ferguson, 53, Irish republican politician, testicular cancer.
Sally Gray, 90, British actress.
Joan Hatcher, 82, New Zealand cricketer.
Ben Heppner, 63, Canadian politician, bone cancer.
Padmini, 74, Indian actress in Tamil, Malayalam, Hindi, Telugu and Kannada films, heart attack.
Patrick Quinn, 56, American actor, president of Actors' Equity Association (2000–2006), heart attack.
Thomas Stewart, 78, American bass-baritone opera singer.
Tetsuro Tamba, 84, Japanese actor.
Henry Townsend, 96, American blues guitarist, pianist and songwriter, pulmonary edema.

25
Safia Ahmed-jan, 65, Afghan women's rights advocate, shot.
Omar al-Faruq, 35, Kuwaiti senior member of al-Qaeda, shot.
Jeff Cooper, 86, American small arms expert.
Maureen Daly, 85, American author (Seventeenth Summer).
John M. Ford, 49, American science fiction and fantasy writer, natural causes.
Sir Vijay Singh, 75, Indo-Fijian lawyer and politician, cancer.
 Sir Iain Tennant, 87, Scottish businessman and public servant.
Metropolitan Vitaly Ustinov, 96, Russian First Hierarch of the Russian Orthodox Church Outside Russia (1985–2001).

26
Gerhard Behrendt, 77, German inventor of Sandmännchen children's television character. 
Giuseppe Bennati, 85, Italian film director.
Laurence Jonathan Cohen, 83, British philosopher.
Iva Toguri D'Aquino, 90, Japanese American convicted and later pardoned of being World War II propagandist "Tokyo Rose".
Mihály Fülöp, 70, Hungarian Olympic fencer.
Byron Nelson, 94, American professional golfer.
Sir Philip Randle, 80, British biochemist.
Sir Martin Roth, 88, Hungarian-born British president of the Royal College of Psychiatrists.
John Salisse, 80, British businessman and magician.
Ralph Story, 86, American radio broadcaster and television host (The $64,000 Challenge), emphysema.

27
Geraldine Guest, 83, American baseball player (AAGPBL).
William Horwitz, 88, American chemist.
Helmut Kallmeyer, 95, German chemist and Aktion T4 perpetrator.
Craig Kusick, 57, American former first baseman for the Minnesota Twins, leukemia.
Arthur Marwick, 70, British historian, first professor of history at the Open University.
Sir Michael Pollock, 89, British admiral, First Sea Lord (1971–1974).

28
George Balzer, 91, American writer for Jack Benny's radio and TV shows.
Adam Curle, 90, British academic and peace activist.
James Hamilton, 4th Baron Hamilton of Dalzell, 68, British aristocrat and politician, cancer.
Virgil Ierunca, 86, Romanian writer.

29
 Rosamond Carr, 94, American fashion illustrator turned humanitarian and activist.
 Billy Mauch, 85, American child actor and sound editor.
Jan Werner Danielsen, 30, Norwegian singer, heart failure.
Gerry Gazzard, 81, English footballer.
Walter Hadlee, 91, New Zealand cricketer, stroke.
Louis-Albert Vachon, 94, Canadian Archbishop Emeritus of Québec.

30
Isabel Bigley, 80, American stage actress, Tony Award-winner for Guys and Dolls.
Josh Graves, 79, American bluegrass dobro player.
Bert James, 92, Australian politician, MP for Hunter (1960–1980).
Adolf H. Lundin, 73, Swedish oil and mining entrepreneur, leukemia.
Pino Mlakar, 99, Slovenian ballet dancer.
André Schwarz-Bart, 78, French novelist.
András Sütő, 79, Romanian writer of Hungarian descent, melanoma.

References

2006-09
 09